Orsellinic acid, more specifically o-orsellinic acid, is a phenolic acid. It is of importance in the biochemistry of lichens, from which it can be extracted. It is a common subunit of depsides.

Chemistry 
It can be prepared by the oxidation of orsellaldehyde.

This is also produced when everninic acid and ramalic acid is boiled with barium hydroxide. It forms colorless crystals in the form of needles which on rapid heating melt with decomposition in the neighborhood of 175 °C. [Sep 22, 2021: this citation to J Chromatog 511 needs to be revised because that paper makes no reference to crystals of orsellinic acid nor its melting point.  In fact, the text never specifically mentions orsellinic acid: it simply appears in Tables I, II & III.]

References 

Dihydroxybenzoic acids
Salicylic acids
Alkyl-substituted benzenes